is a sub-kilometer asteroid, classified as near-Earth object and potentially hazardous asteroid of the  Aten group, approximately  in diameter. It passed 3.25 lunar distances (LD) from Earth on 8 June 2014. It was discovered on 23 April 2014 by NEOWISE. It is estimated that an impact event would have had the energy equivalent of 2,000 megatons of TNT and would have created a  impact crater. The news media misleadingly nicknamed it The Beast.  previously passed this close to Earth in 1952 and will not again until at least 2307. Radar imaging suggests it may be a contact binary.

Orbit 
 orbits the Sun at a distance of 0.6–1.1 AU once every 0 years and 9 months (287 days; semi-major axis of 0.85 AU). Its orbit has an eccentricity of 0.26 and an inclination of 26° with respect to the ecliptic.

2014 close approach 

On 6 June 2014, the asteroid brightened to about apparent magnitude 13.7 while in the southern constellation of Horologium. Near its closest approach to Earth of 3.25 lunar distances on 8 June 2014, the asteroid crossed the celestial equator, making it a northern hemisphere object. It however had an elongation of about 20 degrees from the Sun, and was lost in astronomical twilight during the closest approach to Earth. The Goldstone Deep Space Network observed the asteroid later on 8 June 2014, when the asteroid was between 3.6 and 3.8 lunar distances.

Physical characteristics 

According to the survey carried out by the NEOWISE mission of NASA's Wide-field Infrared Survey Explorer,  measures kilometers in diameter and its surface has an albedo of  based on an absolute magnitude of 18.9.

Radar observations at Goldstone suggest that the object is elongated and irregular in shape, with its long axis measuring at least . Lance Benner suspects it the be a contact binary, composed of two merged objects forming a single asteroid with a lobed shape.

Photometric observations by astronomers with the Mission Accessible Near-Earth Objects Survey (MANOS) and subsequent evaluation by Brian Warners Collaborative Asteroid Lightcurve Link, determined that  has a rotation period of at least 16 hours. While the object's spectral type is unknown, Warner assumes it to be an S-type asteroid, based on its high albedo, which is typical for stony asteroids.

Related objects
On average, an object about the size of  will pass this close to Earth every few years. Similar events, where other 100+ meter diameter asteroids have or will soon pass less than 4 LD from Earth, include:
 4179 Toutatis (~3000 meters in diameter) passed 4.0 LD from Earth on 29 September 2004
  (~500 meters in diameter) passed 1.1 LD from Earth on 3 July 2006
  (~360 meters in diameter) passed 0.8 LD from Earth on 8 November 2011
  (~140 meters in diameter) passed 3.2 LD from Earth on 4 March 2014
  (~600 meters in diameter) passed 3.1 LD from Earth on 26 January 2015

See also
List of asteroid close approaches to Earth in 2014

References

External links 
 Near-Earth Asteroid 2014 HQ124  (Slooh broadcast 5 June 2014)
 High Resolution Radar at Arecibo Observatory Reveals Asteroid As a Beauty, Not a Beast (USRA June 12, 2014)
 
 
 

Minor planet object articles (unnumbered)
Earth-crossing asteroids

20140608
20140423